The María Alejandra was a Spanish oil tanker built in 1975 in Cádiz, Spain. She sank suddenly on high seas some 130-150 km off the coast west of Nouadhibou, Mauritania on 11 March 1980 after several internal explosions, presumably related to malfunctions in the inert gas system. Of the 43 people aboard, 36 perished.

She was the penultimate ship built by Astilleros de Cádiz, (Cádiz) one of the main shipyards in Spain. Before its completion the original customer, the Italian company D'Amico Società di Navegazione, canceled the contract. Finally in 1977 she was acquired by Mar Oil, member of the Wilson Walton group, to bring oil from Ras Tanura in the Persian Gulf to refineries in Algeciras in southern Spain. During the return trip from Algeciras to Ras Tanura (on which her fatal accident happened) the ship was unloaded, on ballast.

Accident 
On 4 March 1980 the María Alejandra arrived to Algeciras Bay and unloaded the oil she brought from the Persian Gulf in the CEPSA refinery. During unloading the crew found problems with the inert gas system, which prevents explosions in the holds. The unloading ended on 6 March and preparations for the next leg back to Ras Tanura started next. In the first hours of 8 March she left port again, however the problems with the inert gas system were not fully resolved yet, and the crew were working on them en route.

After a stop at Las Palmas in the Canary Islands she was sailing south along the western African coast headed for the Cape of Good Hope and the Indian Ocean. At about 13:30 hours Spanish time on 11 March an explosion was felt aboard, suddenly followed by other explosions. According to the survivors the ship broke apart and sank in about 40 seconds.

References

External links
http://hemeroteca.abc.es/nav/Navigate.exe/hemeroteca/madrid/abc/1980/03/13/001.html
http://astilleroscadiz.buques.org/Construcciones/AESA/Ultimas%20Construcciones.htm
http://delamarylosbarcos.wordpress.com/2010/03/11/la-tragedia-del-petrolero-espanol-maria-alejandra/
http://www.elpais.com/articulo/espana/SUAREZ/_ADOLFO/MAR_OIL/_SA/hay/esperanzas/encontrar/supervivientes/Maria/Alejandra/elpepiesp/19800314elpepinac_30/Tes

1975 ships
Maritime incidents in 1980
Oil tankers
Ships built in Spain